Alessandro Evangelisti (born 29 May 1981) is an Italian former footballer who played as a midfielder.

External links
 Alessando Evangelisti's profile on San Marino Calcio's official website 
 AIC profile (data by football.it) 

1981 births
Italian footballers
Living people
U.S. Livorno 1915 players
A.C. Prato players
S.P.A.L. players
A.S.D. Victor San Marino players
Olbia Calcio 1905 players
Potenza S.C. players
Association football midfielders